Oscar Manuel Negrete Padilla (born 18 July 1987) is a Colombian born American boxer. He current NABF Bantamweight champion since June 30, 2017. At his amateur career best result was a gold medal at light-flyweight at the 2010 South American Games, defeated Alberto Melián in the final.

Amateur career

At the 2006 Central American and Caribbean Games he lost by 7:12 in the semi-final against Odilon Zaleta. At the 2007 Pan American Games he lost at the quarter-final against Winston Mendez Montero. At the 2007 World Championships he lost early to Pál Bedák. At the second Olympic qualifier he won to Paulo Carvalho and lost against Yampier Hernández.

Professional boxing record

|-style="text-align:center; background:#e3e3e3;"
|style="border-style:none none solid solid; "|
|style="border-style:none none solid solid; "|Result
|style="border-style:none none solid solid; "|Record
|style="border-style:none none solid solid; "|Opponent
|style="border-style:none none solid solid; "|Type
|style="border-style:none none solid solid; "|Round, time
|style="border-style:none none solid solid; "|Date
|style="border-style:none none solid solid; "|Location
|style="border-style:none none solid solid; "|Notes
|- align=center
|24
|Loss
|19–3–2
|align=left| Ronny Rios
|UD
|10
|13 Feb 2021
|align=left| 
|
|- align=center
|23
|Win
|19–2–2
|align=left| Alberto Melián
|UD
|10
|6 Feb 2020
|align=left| 
|align=left|
|- align=center
|22
|Draw
|18–2–2
|align=left| Joshua Franco
|SD
|10
|10 Aug 2019
|align=left| 
|align=left|
|- align=center
|21
|Loss
|18–2–1
|align=left| Joshua Franco
|SD
|10
|25 Apr 2019
|align=left| 
|align=left|
|- align=center
|20
|Draw
|18–1–1
|align=left| Joshua Franco
|SD
|10
|4 Oct 2018
|align=left| 
|align=left|
|- align=center
|19
|Win
|18–1
|align=left| Diuhl Olguin
|UD
|8
|6 Jul 2018
|align=left|
|align=left|
|- align=center
|18
|Lose
|17–1
|align=left| Rey Vargas
|UD
|12
|2 Dec 2017
|align=left| 
|align=left|
|- align=center
|17
|Win
|17–0
| align=left| Sergio Frias
|RTD
|8 (10) 
|30 Jun 2017
|align=left| 
|align=left|
|- align=center
|16
|Win
|16–0
| align=left| Victor Ruiz
|UD
|8
|5 May 2017
|align=left|
|align=left|
|- align=center
|15
|Win
|15–0
| align=left| Raul Hidalgo
|KO
|4 (8) 
|2 Dec 2016
|align=left|
|align=left|
|- align=center
|14
|Win
|14–0
| align=left| José Bustos
|UD
|10
|1 Jul 2016
|align=left|
|align=left|
|- align=center
|13
|Win
|13–0
| align=left| Neftali Campos
|UD
|8
|4 Mar 2016
|align=left|
|align=left|
|- align=center
|12
|Win
|12–0
| align=left| Ernesto Guerrero
|
|3 (6) 
|4 Dec 2015
|align=left|
|align=left|
|- align=center
|11
|Win
|11–0
| align=left| Jose Estrella
|RTD
|6 (8) 
|18 Sep 2015
|align=left|
|align=left|
|- align=center
|10
|Win
|10–0
| align=left| Ramiro Robles
|UD
|8
|2 Jul 2015
|align=left|
|align=left|
|- align=center
|9
|Win
|9–0
| align=left| Luis Maldonado
|
|5 (6) 
|7 May 2015
|align=left|
|align=left|
|- align=center
|8
|Win
|8–0
| align=left| Fernando Fuentes
|SD
|6
|27 Feb 2015
|align=left|
|align=left|
|- align=center
|7
|Win
|7–0
| align=left| Salvador Perez
|TKO
|2 (4) 
|10 Oct 2014
|align=left|
|align=left|
|- align=center
|6
|Win
|6–0
| align=left| Gabriel Braxton
|
|1 (4) 
|11 Sep 2014
|align=left|
|align=left|
|- align=center
|5
|Win
|5–0
| align=left| Carlos Medina
|UD
|4
|9 Jul 2014
|align=left|
|align=left|
|- align=center
|4
|Win
|4–0
| align=left| Pablo Cupul
|
|2 (6) 
|6 Jun 2014
|align=left|
|align=left|
|- align=center
|3
|Win
|3–0
| align=left| Jesus Domenech
|
|6
|10 Aug 2013
|align=left|
|align=left|
|- align=center
|2
|Win
|2–0
| align=left| Ramon Barboza
|UD
|4
|28 Jun 2013
|align=left|
|align=left| 
|- align=center
|1
|Win
|1–0
| align=left| Cristian Ciciliano
|
|4
|24 May 2013
|align=left|
|align=left|
|- align=center

References

External links
Central American Games 2006
World Championships 2007
Colombian Nationals 2007

Living people
Light-flyweight boxers
Boxers at the 2007 Pan American Games
Boxers at the 2011 Pan American Games
Pan American Games competitors for Colombia
Colombian male boxers
1987 births
Central American and Caribbean Games bronze medalists for Colombia
South American Games gold medalists for Colombia
South American Games bronze medalists for Colombia
South American Games medalists in boxing
Competitors at the 2006 South American Games
Competitors at the 2010 South American Games
Competitors at the 2006 Central American and Caribbean Games
Central American and Caribbean Games medalists in boxing
People from Córdoba Department
Bantamweight boxers